Jean Barre may refer to:

 Jean Alexandre Barré (1880–1967), French neurologist
 Jean Barre (canoeist) (born 1945), Canadian sprint canoer